Events from the year 1880 in art.

Events
 October – Vincent van Gogh enrolls in a beginners art course at the Académie Royale des Beaux-Arts in Brussels.
 Fifth Impressionist exhibition in Paris, at 10 rue des Pyramides. The realist painter Jean-François Raffaëlli is also invited by Degas to exhibit.
 Silver Studio founded by Arthur Silver in London for textile and wallpaper design.
 Anton Mauve paints Changing Pasture; his palette and usage of colour influences Vincent van Gogh.
 Michael Ancher marries fellow painter Anna Brøndum.
 National Gallery of Canada established in Ottawa.

Awards
 Grand Prix de Rome, painting: Henri Lucien Doucet.
 Grand Prix de Rome, sculpture:
 Grand Prix de Rome, architecture:
 Grand Prix de Rome, music: Lucien Joseph Edouard Hillemacher.

Works

 Frédéric Auguste Bartholdi – The Lion of Belfort
 Marie Bashkirtseff – Self-portrait
 Arnold Böcklin – Isle of the Dead (first two versions)
 Marie Bracquemond – On the terrace at Sèvres
 Thomas Brock – A Moment of Peril (equestrian bronze)
 Lady Butler – The Defence of Rorke's Drift
 Alexandre Cabanel – Phèdre
 Gustave Caillebotte
 A Balcony
 Boulevard des Italiens
 Boulevard Seen from Above
 The Bezique Game
 In a Café
 Interior
 Interior, or Woman reading
 A refuge, boulevard Haussmann
 Man on the balcony, boulevard Haussmann
 Man with a top-hat, seated by a  window
 Nude on a divan
 Paul Cézanne – View of Auvers-sur-Oise
 Carl Conrads -  Statue of Alexander Hamilton (granite)
 Pierre Auguste Cot - The Storm
 Alphonse-Marie-Adolphe de Neuville – The Defence of Rorke's Drift, 1879
 Thomas Eakins – The Fairman Rogers Four-in-Hand
 Giovanni Fattori – Quadrato di Villafranca
 Charles Gauthier – Cléopâtre (plaster)
 James Clarke Hook – Home with the Tide
 Daniel Huntington – Portrait of John Adams Dix
 Ivan Kramskoi
 Sergey Botkin
 Ivan Shishkin
 Edward Lear – The Plains of Lombardy from Monte Generoso (Ashmolean Museum, Oxford)
 Édouard Manet 
 Émilie Ambre as Carmen
 A Bundle of Asparagus
 A Sprig of Asparagus
 Albert Joseph Moore – Rose Leaves
 Adolph Alphonse de Neuville – The Defence of Rorke's Drift
 Frank O'Meara – Autumnal greys (Forest of Fontainbleau)
 William Quiller Orchardson – Napoleon on Board the Bellerophon
 Edward Poynter – A Visit to Aesculapius
 Pierre-Auguste Renoir
 Portrait of Irène Cahen d'Anvers
 By the Water
 Dante Gabriel Rossetti – The Day Dream
 Fritz Schaper – Goethe Monument (Berlin)
 Viktor Vasnetsov – Flying Carpet
 Henry Tanworth Wells – Victoria Regina

Births
 February 1 – C. T. Loo, Chinese-born art dealer (died 1957)
 February 8 – Franz Marc, German painter and printmaker, co-founder of Der Blaue Reiter (killed in action 1916)
 March 2 – Joseph Ehrismann, German-born painter and stained-glass maker (died 1937)
 March 21 – Hans Hofmann, German-born abstract expressionist painter and teacher (died 1966)
 April 4 – William Russell Flint, Scottish-born watercolourist (died 1969)
 April 7 – Alexander Bogomazov, Ukrainian painter, artist and modern art theoretician of Russian avant-garde (died 1930)
 May 6 – Ernst Ludwig Kirchner, German expressionist painter, co-founder of Die Brücke (suicide 1938)
 June 10 – André Derain, French Fauvist painter (died 1954)
 August 2 – Arthur Dove, American painter (died 1946)
 August 22 – George Herriman, American cartoonist (Krazy Kat) (died 1944)
 November 19 – Jacob Epstein, American-born British sculptor (died 1959)

Deaths
 January 4 – Anselm Feuerbach, German classicist painter (born 1829)
 February 19 – Constantino Brumidi, American historicist fresco painter (born 1805)
 September 8 – Wilhelm August Rieder, Austrian painter and draughtsman (born 1796)
 October 10 – Giampietro Campana, Italian art collector (born 1808)
 November 20 – Léon Cogniet, French historical and portrait painter (born 1794)
 date unknown
 Philippe Joseph Henri Lemaire, French sculptor (born 1798)
 Henry O'Neill, Irish illustrator and antiquarian (born 1798)
 Nicolae Teodorescu, Moldavian, later Romanian church painter (muralist) (born 1797)

References

 
Years of the 19th century in art
1880s in art